Barahathwa is a municipality of the Sarlahi District in the Janakpur Zone of central Nepal. The municipality was established on 19 September 2015 by merging the existing Barahathwa, Murtiya, Hajariya and Laukat village development committees (VDCs). The center of the municipality is established in the former VDC Office of Barahathwa Bazaar. After merging the four VDCs' populations, it had a total population of 50,424 according to 2011 Nepal census. After the government decision, the number of Nepali municipalities reached 217.

Municipality
The Nepali government announced in 2015 the creation of 26 new municipalities. With this announcement Barahathwa was upgraded to a municipality of Nepal; previously it was merely a proposed municipality. The adjoining villages, or VDCs, of Barahathwa, Shreepur, Murtiya, Hajariya, Janakinagar, Laukat and Sundarpur chuhadaba were merged with Barahathwa to upgrade it to the status of a municipality.

References

External links

Populated places in Sarlahi District
Municipalities in Madhesh Province
Nepal municipalities established in 2015